Yeshiva Ohel Moshe is a Bensonhurst-based, Orthodox elementary school that was opened in 1927.

Under the leadership of the late Rabbi Eliyahu Machlis, Yeshivah Ohel Moshe was known for its "Open Door" policy when accepting students and congregants alike. Since 1927, thousands of students have graduated from Yeshivah Ohel Moshe elementary school, with enriched connection to their Jewish roots and lifelong bonds with their educators and peers. Yeshivah Ohel Moshe was revolutionary in their policy of accepting all, with many of their students receiving education at little or no tuition costs. 

The school and the synagogue, both referred to as Yeshivah Ohel Moshe, are housed in the same building for almost 73 years. They are located at 7914 Bay Parkway in the Bensonhurst neighborhood of Brooklyn, New York.

Today, Yeshivah Ohel Moshe elementary school remains active with many students from grades Kindergarten through eighth grade.

Yeshivah Ohel Moshe has the approbation and Rabbinical Haskama of Rav Avraham Yaakov Pam ZT"L and Rabbi Shmuel Kamentzsky Shlita. 

Rav Pam ZT"L, famed Rosh Yeshivah of Yeshiva Torah Vodaas, gave a speech at a Yeshivah Ohel Moshe parlor meeting just months before his Petirah.

The Shul (Synagogue) at Yeshivah Ohel Moshe has daily Minyanim 365 days a year, which includes two daily Minyanim for Shacharis, one for Mincha and one for Maariv. 

Rabbi Dov Machlis, the youngest son of Rabbi Eliyahu Machlis ZT"L and Rebbetzin Sara Machlis A"H, their children Rabbi Dov Machlis and Rebbetzin Shifra Stone have assumed their parents' roles as Menahel and General Studies Principal, respectfully. 

Rabbi Dov Machlis and his wife are the longtime Rav and Rebbetzin of the Shul and are actively involved in day-to-day responsibilities. 

Recent celebration of the school's 90th anniversary included the completion of the writing of a Sefer Torah. Within a few years of this momentous event, another Sefer Torah was written and completed, with both Sifrei Torah being sponsored by the congregants and former students of Yeshivah Ohel Moshe.

Yeshivah Ohel Moshe is currently celebrating its 95th year since the school's establishment in 1927. In the approximate century since its founding, Yeshivah Ohel Moshe has had thousands of graduates with most of them furthering their Jewish education and leading Orthodox Jewish lifestyles.

The Machlis family

Rabbi Eliyahu Machlis
The late Rabbi Eliyahu Machlis served as Rosh Yeshiva and Dean of the yeshiva and Rabbi and spiritual leader of the Ohel Moshe congregation until his passing in 1990.

Prior positions held by Rabbi Eliyahu (Leon)  Machlis include:
 Elementary school principal, Hebrew Academy of Cleveland
 Spiritual mentor of a Talmud Torah program in East Flatbush
 Rabbi of a Shul in Staten Island

Rebbetzin Sora Machlis
Rebbetzin Sora Machlis, late wife of Rabbi Eliyahu Machlis, served for many years as General Studies Principal.

Rabbi Dov Machlis

Their son, Rabbi Dov Machlis is the present Menahel.

Rebbetzin Shifra Stone
Their daughter, Rebbetzin Shifra Stone is the present General Studies Principal.

Yartzeits 
The Yartzeits of Rabbi Eliyahu and Rebbetzin Sora Machlis are 21 Teves (1990/5750)  and 17 Tamuz (1992/5752), respectively.

References

Bensonhurst, Brooklyn
Orthodox yeshivas in Brooklyn
Jewish day schools
American Orthodox rabbis
1927 establishments in New York (state)